The FIDE Grand Prix 2019 was a series of four chess tournaments that formed part of the qualification cycle for the World Chess Championship 2021. The top two finishers who had not yet qualified, qualified for the Candidates Tournament 2020–21. The top non-qualifying finisher is eligible for the wild card. The series is organized by World Chess, formerly known as Agon. Alexander Grischuk won the FIDE Grand Prix 2019 and thus became the first player to qualify for the Candidates Tournament via the event. Ian Nepomniachtchi, who finished in second place, was the other qualifier, while Maxime Vachier-Lagrave, by finishing third, became eligible for the wild card. Maxime Vachier-Lagrave eventually got a place in the Candidates after Teimour Radjabov withdrew from the tournament as he was the first reserve (by average rating).

Format 
There were four tournaments in the cycle; each consisting of 16 players. There are 21 contestants, who each play in 3 of the 4 tournaments.

The tournaments are knock-out tournaments, in the same style as the Chess World Cup. At each round of the tournament, players play a best-of-2 game knock-out match. The regular games are:
 best-of-2 games at a time limit of 90 minutes, + 30 minutes added after move 40, + 30 second per move increment from move 1.
If the match is tied 1-1, up to four tie breaks are played, at progressively faster time limits, with the match ending when a player wins any tie break. The tie breaks are, in order:
 best-of-2 games at a time limit of 25 minutes, + 10 second per move increment from move 1.
 best-of-2 games at a time limit of 10 minutes, + 10 second per move increment from move 1.
 best-of-2 games at a time limit of 5 minutes, + 3 second per move increment from move 1.
 a single armageddon chess game: white receives 5 minutes + 2 second per move increment from move 61; black receives 4 minutes + 2 second per move increment from move 61; black wins the match in the case of a draw.

Scoring and tie breaks 

Players receive Grand Prix points as follows:

The two players with most Grand Prix points qualified for the Candidates Tournament 2020-21. In the event of a tie on Grand Prix points, the following tie breaks are applied, in order: 
 most tournament wins;
 most tournament second places;
 most points won in standard time control games;
 head-to-head score, in terms of matches, between players tied;
 drawing of lots.

Dates and locations
The tournament dates and locations are as follows:
 Moscow, Russia, 17–29 May 2019;
 Riga, Latvia, 12–24 July 2019;
 Hamburg, Germany, 5–17 November 2019;
 Jerusalem, Israel, 11–23 December 2019.

Prize money
The prize money is €130,000 per single Grand Prix with an additional €280,000 for the overall Grand Prix standings for a total prize fund of €800,000. 

For each individual tournament, the prize money is: €24,000 for the winner, €14,000 for the runner-up, €10,000 for the semi-final losers, €8,000 for the Round 2 losers, and €5,000 for the Round 1 losers.

For the final standings, the prize money is €50,000 for 1st, €45,000 for 2nd, and so on down in steps of €5,000 to €10,000 for 9th, and also €10,000 for 10th. Prize money for players on equal Grand Prix points is shared.

Players 
22 players will be playing in the Grand Prix. 20 qualify by rating (according to the average of the 12 monthly rating lists from February 2018 to January 2019, with ties broken according to the number of games played in that period), and one player is nominated per tournament by the organizer. World Chess nominated the same player, Daniil Dubov, for the first three tournaments, and he will therefore be entitled to participate in the Grand Prix series ranking. 

The list of rating qualifiers was released on 25 January 2019. Five players qualified but declined their invitations: Magnus Carlsen, Fabiano Caruana, Ding Liren, Vladimir Kramnik and Viswanathan Anand. Carlsen and Caruana had no need to play in the tournament (Carlsen as World Champion, and Caruana had already qualified for the Candidates Tournament); Ding Liren was virtually assured of qualifying due to being third in the rating list behind Carlsen and Caruana; while Kramnik had recently announced his retirement. This resulted in the first five reserves being invited.

The main list of 21 players (20 qualifying by rating, plus organizer nominee Dubov), and their schedule, were released on 19 February. 

One more player was nominated for the Jerusalem tournament only, in coordination with the Israel Chess Federation; their result will not be counted in the Grand Prix series ranking;
Boris Gelfand was announced as Jerusalem nominee on 25 October.

Teimour Radjabov and Levon Aronian withdrew from the last stage of Grand Prix for medical reasons, and were replaced by Wang Hao and Dmitry Andreikin.

Events results

Moscow, May 2019

The first tournament was held in Moscow, Russia, from May 17 to 29. Each round had a day each for the two regular games, and a third day for tie-breaks; and there was a rest day before the final round. Games began at 3.00 pm Moscow time (12.00 pm UTC).

Players were seeded according to their rating at the start of the tournament, the May 2019 ratings list. The top four seeds (Giri, Mamedyarov, Nepomniachtchi, and Grischuk) were placed into different quarters of the draw, and the remaining starting positions were decided by the drawing of lots at the opening ceremony on May 16.

Riga, July 2019

2nd stage, Riga, Latvia, 12–24 July 2019

* Yu Yangyi won the match against Aronian because he achieved a draw with the black pieces in the deciding Armageddon game.

Hamburg, November 2019

The third tournament was played in Hamburg, Germany, from 5–17 November 2019. Each round had three days of play: two for the regular time control matches, and one for tie breaks, if required. Round 1 was November 5–7, Round 2 was November 8–10, Round 3 was November 11–13, November 14 was a rest day, and Round 4 was November 15–17.

Jerusalem, December 2019

4th stage, Jerusalem, Israel, 11–23 December 2019. On November 30, 2019, FIDE announced that Teimour Radjabov and Levon Aronian will be replaced in FIDE Grand Prix Jerusalem for medical reasons by Wang Hao and Dmitry Andreikin from the reserve list of Grand Prix participants.

* Karjakin advanced to the second round due to achieving a draw as Black against Harikrishna in the Armageddon game.

Grand Prix standings

The following table shows the overall Grand Prix standings. The top two players qualified for the Candidates Tournament.

Radjabov qualified for the Candidates by winning the Chess World Cup 2019. Giri and Vachier-Lagrave qualified because of their ratings. Initially it seemed that Vachier-Lagrave had lost his chance to qualify for the Candidates when Nepomniachtchi won the final Grand Prix tournament; but Vachier-Lagrave was first reserve and thus qualified when Radjabov withdrew.

References

External links
 Guide to Moscow Grand Prix 2019, official site of the 1st Grand Prix tournament, Moscow, 17-29 May 2019.
 Guide to Riga Grand Prix 2019 , official site of the 2nd Grand Prix tournament, Riga, July 2019
 FIDE World Chess Grand Prix Riga 2019, site of TeleSchach, July 2019

FIDE Grand Prix
2019 in chess